The field hockey tournaments at the 2024 Summer Olympics in Paris are scheduled to run from 27 July to 9 August at Stade Yves-du-Manoir, a legacy venue of the 1924 Summer Olympics. Twenty-four teams (twelve each for men and women) will compete against each other in their respective tournaments.

Qualification
The International Olympic Committee and the International Hockey Federation (FIH) have ratified and released the qualification criteria for Paris 2024 on March 30, 2022. Each of the continental champions from five confederations (Africa, Americas, Asia, Europe, and Oceania) will secure the men's and women's spots for their respective NOC, whereas host nation France receives a direct quota place each in the men's and women's tournament after they have attained the top twenty-five spot or higher in the FIH world ranking list.

The remainder of the quota places will be attributed to the eligible NOCs with a substantial ranking through two separate FIH Olympic qualifying tournaments. The top three squads at the end of each tournament will secure the berths to complete the twelve-team field for Paris 2024. If the French hockey players win the 2023 EuroHockey Championships, the number of places in two wildcard tournaments will rise to seven, with the remaining spot offered to the highest-ranked of the two bronze medal losers.

Men's qualification

Women's qualification

Medal summary

Medal table

Events

See also
Field hockey at the 2022 Asian Games
Field hockey at the 2023 African Games
Field hockey at the 2023 Pan American Games

References

 
Field hockey at the Summer Olympics
2024 Summer Olympics events
Summer Olympics
2024 Summer Olympics
Summer Olympics